Major's tufted-tailed rat (Eliurus majori) is a species of rodent in the family Nesomyidae. It is found only in Madagascar. Its natural habitat is subtropical or tropical dry forests. It is threatened by habitat loss. The species was named in honor of Swiss zoologist C. I. Forsyth Major.

References

Musser, G. G. and M. D. Carleton. 2005. Superfamily Muroidea. pp. 894–1531 in Mammal Species of the World a Taxonomic and Geographic Reference. D. E. Wilson and D. M. Reeder eds. Johns Hopkins University Press, Baltimore.

Eliurus
Mammals of Madagascar
Mammals described in 1895
Taxa named by Oldfield Thomas
Taxonomy articles created by Polbot